William Gumley (28 June 1923 – 14 August 1988) was an Australian cricketer. He played in two first-class matches for Queensland in 1948/49.

See also
 List of Queensland first-class cricketers

References

External links
 

1923 births
1988 deaths
Australian cricketers
Queensland cricketers
Cricketers from New South Wales